David Hector Campbell (September 11, 1925 – December 28, 2015) was a Canadian basketball player who competed in the 1948 Summer Olympics. Campbell was born in Vancouver. He was part of the Canadian basketball team, which finished ninth in the Olympic tournament. He also served as a justice of the British Columbia Supreme Court from 1990 to 1996.

References

External links
Dave Campbell's obituary

1925 births
2015 deaths
Basketball people from British Columbia
Basketball players at the 1948 Summer Olympics
Canadian men's basketball players
Canadian people of Scottish descent
Judges in British Columbia
Olympic basketball players of Canada
Basketball players from Vancouver
UBC Thunderbirds basketball players